John Twiggs Myers (January 29, 1871 – April 17, 1952) was a United States Marine Corps general who was most famous for his service as the American Legation Guard in Peking during the Boxer Rebellion.

Early life

The son of Marion Twiggs (daughter of General David E. Twiggs) and West Point graduate and U.S. Army Officer, later Confederate Quartermaster General Abraham Myers, J.T. Myers (known as "Jack" or jokingly, "Handsome Jack," to his friends) was born on January 29, 1871, in Wiesbaden, Germany.

He graduated from the United States Naval Academy in 1892 and was appointed an assistant engineer two years later. In March 1895 he was commissioned a second lieutenant in the United States Marines Corps. The city of Fort Myers, Florida was originally named for J.T. Myers' father.

In 1896 he became a Hereditary Companion of the Military Order of Foreign Wars by right of his father's service in the Mexican War. He was later eligible to become a Veteran Companion in the order by right of his own service in the Spanish–American War, Boxer Rebellion, Philippine Insurrection, and First World War.

Service in Asia
After studying at the Naval War College in Newport, Rhode Island, Myers was sent on active duty at the outbreak of the Spanish–American War. He led a detachment which participated in the capture of Guam from its Spanish garrison, and sailed with the USS Charleston to the Philippines, then being attached to the USS Baltimore.

During the Philippine–American War, he led several amphibious landings against Filipino rebels in 1899, gaining recognition for his heroic conduct. He was promoted to captain sometime in 1899.

In May 1900, Myers was sent to China aboard the cruiser USS Newark and put ashore with a detachment of 48 marines (including then Private Daniel Daly) and 3 sailors to guard the US Legation in Peking, just as the Boxer Rebellion broke out. Myers' Marines occupied a wall defending the Legations, arguably the most vulnerable part of the defensive position, and led an attack (along with Russian and British troops) as part of a ferocious battle on July 3 which dislodged the main Boxer position near the wall. Myers was wounded in the leg by a spear; his attack was claimed by the British Consul, Sir Claude Maxwell MacDonald, as "one of the most successful operations of the siege, as it rendered our position on the wall, which had been precarious, comparatively strong." As a result of his bravery in this action, he was brevetted major and advanced four numbers in rank. In 1921, Myers would also become one of only 20 living marines to be awarded the USMC Brevet Medal when that decoration was created. Upon recovering from his wounds, he served as the provost marshal on American Samoa and was then transferred to the Marine barracks at Bremerton, Washington.

Later services
Myers led the detachment of marines which accompanied the USS Brooklyn to Tangier, Morocco, during the Perdicaris incident in 1904. After the incident was concluded, Myers held various other posts, both barracks commands and naval commands, including a time period commanding the Marine attachment of the Asiatic Fleet. He took part in expeditions to Santo Domingo (1912) and Cuba (1913), and during World War I served as the counter-intelligence officer of the Atlantic Fleet.

Myers was made inspector general of the Department of the Pacific in 1921, serving in that post for three years, and from 1925 to 1928 commanded the 1st Marine Brigade, stationed in Haiti. He served various other posts, including, briefly, commander of the Department of the Pacific, before retiring a major general in 1934; after his retirement, in 1942, he was given the rank of lieutenant general. He relocated to Miami, Florida, after his retirement and died in Coconut Grove on April 17, 1952.

Fictional portrayals
While not actually portrayed on film, Myers has inspired characters in several films. In the historical epic 55 Days at Peking, Charlton Heston portrayed Marine Major Matt Lewis, commanding the American Legation Guard in Peking during the Boxer Rebellion. In The Wind and the Lion, the fictional Captain Jerome (played by Steve Kanaly) took on Myers' historical role, commanding the Marines dispatched to Tangier during the Perdicaris incident.

Awards
General Myers' medals and decorations included:

See also

References

General
 
 
 
 

Specific

External links
 Arlington National Cemetery Article

United States Marine Corps generals
United States Naval Academy alumni
1871 births
1952 deaths
American military personnel of the Boxer Rebellion
American military personnel of the Philippine–American War
American military personnel of the Spanish–American War
American people of British-Jewish descent
Burials at Arlington National Cemetery
American military personnel of the Banana Wars
United States Marine Corps personnel of World War I
Naval War College alumni